"Baby Don't Cry" is a song recorded by Japanese recording artist Namie Amuro for her eighth studio album, Play (2007). It was written, composed, arranged, and produced by Japanese musician Naoaki Yamato, under the alias Nao'ymt. The single also included the B-side track "Nobody", a re-recorded version of her single "White Light". It premiered on January 24, 2007 as the third single from the album in Japan. It was also released worldwide on February 21, 2007 through Avex Entertainment Inc. Musically, "Baby Don't Cry" is a pop ballad, influenced by R&B music.

Upon its release, the track garnered generally favorable reviews from music critics, who highlighted the song as one of Amuro's best singles, and commended the production and her vocals. It achieved success in Japan, peaking at number three on the Oricon Singles Chart. The single has been certified within three different categories by the Recording Industry Association of Japan (RIAJ). An accompanying music video was shot by Masashi Muto; it features Amuro walking around a city, singing in the winter time. With additional promotion through Japanese commercials and television shows, the song has been performed on several concert tours by Amuro, including her 2007 Play tour and 2008 Best Fiction tour.

Background and release
On December 28, 2006, Japanese magazine CD Journal confirmed the release of a new single, entitled "Baby Don't Cry". It was written, composed, arranged, and produced by Japanese musician Naoaki Yamato, under the alias Nao'ymt. The song was recorded in 2006 at On Air Azabu Studio, Minato-ku, Tokyo by Toshihiro Wako. The song contains backing vocals by Japanese vocalist Hiromi. The single also included the B-side track "Nobody", a re-recorded version of her single "White Light". It was intended to appear on Amuro's eighth studio album, Play, as the original version was omitted. However, the re-recorded version did not end up on the final track list. It premiered on January 24, 2007 as the third single from the album in Japan. It was also released worldwide on February 21, 2007 through Avex Entertainment Inc.

The CD single contains both "Baby Don't Cry" and "Nobody", plus shortened versions of the tracks. These versions were used for various Japanese television commercials. The CD artwork features a close-up facial shot of Amuro, whilst the DVD single has a close up with her face and eyes closed. The DVD single includes the music video to "Baby Don't Cry". Both formats features an extra lyric booklet, printed on plain white paper. Musically, "Baby Don't Cry" is a pop ballad, influenced by R&B and J-pop music. Japanese music editor Random J compared the composition to the works of American recording artist, Janet Jackson. CD Journal staff member's felt the song's composition was "simplistic", and described the lyrical content as "painful".

Critical response
Upon its release, "Baby Don't Cry" received positive reviews from most music critics. Staff members from Amazon were positive in their review, labeling the song and Amuro's vocal delivery as "impressive". They also complimented Nao'ymt's "perfect" collaboration with Amuro. An editor writing from CD Journal praised the song's mixture of R&B and pop genres. They also felt it was a "classic representation" of Amuro's music inside of the 21st century. AllMusic's editor Adam Greenberg commended the song's departure from the album's electronic music, saying "'Baby Don't Cry' finally gives a peek at Amuro's vocals with less electronic additions...". AllMusic staff selected the single as one of Amuro's best songs in her discography.

Commercial performance
Commercial, "Baby Don't Cry" was successful in Japan. It debuted at number three on the Oricon Daily Singles Chart, and stayed there for four days. This resulted in a debut position of number three on the Oricon Singles Chart, two positions behind entries by Mr. Children and Masafumi Akikawa; it sold 52,168 units within its first week of sales. This became Amuro's first single in six years to sell over 50,000 units in its first week since "Say the Word". The following week, it fell to number four with 24,643 units sold within its second week of sales. It slipped again to number seven with 18,663 units sold in its third week of sales, and had its last top ten appearance the following week at number nine; it sold 13,088 units. It lasted 15 weeks in the Top 200 chart, and sold over 144,081 units by the end of 2007; it ranked at number 48 on Oricon's Annual Singles Chart. This became Amuro's highest selling single since "Say the Word" (with 184,000 units sold), and was her highest selling single until it was outsold by her 2011 single "Sit! Stay! Wait! Down!/Love Story" (with 162,000 units sold). "Baby Don't Cry" was certified gold by the Recording Industry Association of Japan (RIAJ) for shipments of 100,000 units.

The single was certified million in May 2007 by the RIAJ for ringtone sales of one million units in Japan. This is her first single to be certified million by RIAJ since her 1997 single "How to Be a Girl", and was her sixth overall. Although the song has not charted on any digital record charts in Japan, it was cerfifed double platinum by the RIAJ for cellphone sales of 500,000 units. It was certified gold in December 2012 by the RIAJ for digital sales of 100,000 units.

Live performances and music video
The single has been performed on several tours conducted by Amuro, and has appeared on Japanese commercials and television series. "Baby Don't Cry" made its debut live performance on her Play Tour (2008), which was in support of the album with the same title. The live DVD was released on February 27, 2008. It was included on Amuro's greatest hits concert tour, Best Fiction 2008–2009; it was performed as the final song from the setlist. The live DVD was released on September 9, 2009. The track appeared on her Past<Future concert tour in 2010, and was included on the live release on December 12, 2010. In celebration of Amuro's 20th music career anniversary, the single was included on her 5 Major Dome concert tour in Japan; the song was performed as an encore track. The live DVD was released on February 27, 2013. The song's most recent appearance was her Live Style concert tour (2014), where it was included on as the last track from the setlist. The live DVD was released on February 11, 2015.

"Baby Don't Cry" was used as the theme song for the Japanese television drama series, Himitsu no Hanazono (2007). Alongside this, it was included in three Japanese commercials: the Avex Trax "Myu-Umo" music commercial, the Pokemero Joysound commercial, and for the Fuji TV television series, Secret Garden. An accompanying music video was shot in Japan by Masashi Muto. It opens with Amuro running on outdoor steps, and walking along a pavement bridge. As the chorus starts, intercut scenes of trees are shown, as she walks through the city. The second verse has her walking through a park, with yellow-ish leaves on the ground. She witnessed two small children on a park bench, holding the chain to a dog. The third chorus then has her walking through a city square, and ends with her standing on a beach front at sunset. A short version of the video was uploaded on Amuro's YouTube page on November 16, 2011, whilst a full version was uploaded one month later.

Track listings and formats

Japanese CD single
 "Baby Don't Cry" – 5:22
 "Nobody" – 4:46
 "Baby Don't Cry" (TV Mix) – 5:22
 "Nobody" (TV Mix) – 4:46

Japanese DVD single
 "Baby Don't Cry" – 5:22
 "Nobody" – 4:46
 "Baby Don't Cry" (TV Mix) – 5:22
 "Nobody" (TV Mix) – 4:46
 "Baby Don't Cry" (Music video) – 5:25

Digital download
 "Baby Don't Cry" – 5:22
 "Nobody" – 4:46

Credits and personnel
Credits adapted from the liner notes of the Play album.
Recording
Recorded at On Air Azabu Studio, Minato-ku, Tokyo (2005).

Personnel
Namie Amuro – vocals, background vocals
Naoaki "Nao'ymt" Yamato – songwriting, composition, producing, arranging
Toshihiro Wako – recording
Yoshiaki Onishi – mixing

Hiromi – background vocals
Vision Factory – management
Masashi Muto – video director

Charts

Charts

Year-end charts

Certifications

Release history

See also
"White Light" – Corresponding song that relates to B-side track, "Nobody".

Notes

References

External links
"Baby Don't Cry" – Namie Amuro's official website.

2007 singles
Namie Amuro songs
Japanese television drama theme songs
2005 songs
Avex Trax singles
2000s ballads
Pop ballads